Most Beloved or Beloved is an album by Leslie Cheung released in 1995 after a long personal struggle between deciding to make a comeback or to make good his retirement vow. It was also his first album with Rock Records.

It marked the milestone of another chapter of Leslie Cheung's career as it was his first album after supposedly retiring from the music world six years ago at the height of his career.

Track listing
"A Thousand Dreams of You" – 3:31
深情相擁 "Endless Embrace" (duet with Winnie Hsin) – 3:35
夜半歌聲 "Midnight Singer" – 3:19
 Main theme song of the film, The Phantom Lover
今生今世 "In This Lifetime" – 4:23
 Theme song from the film, He's a Woman, She's a Man
當愛已成往事 "Bygone Love" – 5:02
 Ending theme song of the film, Farewell My Concubine; originally sung by Sandy Lam and Jonathan Lee
一輩子失去了妳 "Losing You Forever" – 4:21
追 "Chase" – 5:23
 Theme song from the film, He's a Woman, She's a Man
眉來眼去 "Make Passes" – 4:04
紅顏白髮 "The White-Haired Beauty" – 3:25
 From the film, The Bride with White Hair
何去何從之阿飛正傳 "Choice" – 3:14
 Theme song of the film Days of Being Wild

Leslie Cheung albums
1995 albums